In music, Op. 47 stands for Opus number 47. Compositions that are assigned this number include:

 Albéniz – Suite Española No. 1
 Barber – Third Essay
 Beethoven – Violin Sonata No. 9
 Britten – Five Flower Songs
 Bruch – Kol Nidrei
 Chopin – Ballade No. 3
 Dvořák – Bagatelles
 Elgar – Introduction and Allegro
 Ginastera – Sonata for guitar
 Holst – Egdon Heath
 Prokofiev – Symphony No. 4
 Saint-Saëns – Samson and Delilah
 Schumann – Piano Quartet
 Shostakovich – Symphony No. 5
 Sibelius – Violin Concerto
 Strauss – Des Dichters Abendgang